Daniele Boschin is an Italian lightweight rower. He won a gold medal at the 1982 World Rowing Championships in Lucerne with the lightweight men's four.

References

Year of birth missing (living people)
Living people
Italian male rowers
World Rowing Championships medalists for Italy